Andonis George Manganaris-Decavalles, known as Andonis Manganaris-Decavalles (1920 – 2008), whose pen name is Andonis Decavalles), Greek-American poet and professor 
Andonis Michaelides (1958 – 2011), known as Mick Karn, English-Cypriot musician and songwriter

See also

Adonis (disambiguation)
Andoni (name)
Antonis